Shashi Kant is a 1977 batch, Punjab cadre Indian Police Service (IPS) officer who has served in several positions in his career before retiring in 2012 as Director General of Police (DGP). He was the Director General (Prisons), Punjab, India from October 2011 to June 2012.

Post retirement
The former DGP is known for his crusade against Illegal drug trade in the state of Punjab and has named several senior Ministers who are patronizing drugs. In 2012 he took part in the Indian anti-corruption movement led by social activist Anna Hazare.

References

People from Bareilly
1954 births
Living people